Alexander S. Gross (1917 – March 10, 1980), was an American Orthodox rabbi who established the Hebrew Academy of Greater Miami, the first Orthodox Jewish day school south of Baltimore, Maryland. Gross played a central role in the establishment of Jewish life in south Florida.

A graduate of Yeshiva Torah Vodaath and the Mesivta, he was also educated at Columbia University. In addition, he studied advanced Jewish Studies at the University of Miami.

Gross was the president of the Rabbinical Alliance of America, was active in the United Jewish Appeal and in the State of Israel Bonds, was regional chairman of Torah U'Mesorah, and was a member of the Rabbinical Council of America's educational committee. He was a strong supporter of Israel, visiting in 1963, and spending a sabbatical year there in 1973–74.  Gross was a close student of Rabbi Shraga Feivel Mendlowitz, the founder of Torah U'Mesorah, an outreach and educational organization, that was described by the words of Rabbi Moshe Feinstein: "Were it not for him, there would be no Torah study and no Fear of Heaven at all in America."

References

External links

Bibliography
Rabbi Gross Passes Away at Age 63: Interment Takes Place in Israel

American Orthodox rabbis
1917 births
1980 deaths
20th-century American rabbis